Rich Dodson (born 1947) is a Canadian musician and songwriter who is the guitarist, vocalist and a founding member of the rock trio The Stampeders.  He is best known for penning the group's biggest hit, "Sweet City Woman", which hit number 1 in Canada and number 8 on the US Billboard in 1971.  He also wrote other notable hits for the band such as "Wild Eyes" (1972), "Devil You" (1971), "Johnny Lightning" (1974) and "Carry Me" (1971).

Dodson has stated that his influences come from instrumental bands of the 1960s such as The Ventures and The Shadows, as well as Lovin' Spoonful and The Zombies. On stage, he is known for playing his self-designed Fender double neck guitar.

Dodson left the Stampeders in 1978 to pursue his interests in music production and built his own 24-track recording studio called Marigold Studios. There he produced his own solo material as well as producing and engineering "Fate Stay with Me" (1987) for Alanis Morissette. In that same year, he began his nationally distributed independent record label called Marigold Productions. Dodson went on to have a successful solo career with three top-ten hits in Canada including "Lookin' Back" (1981), "She's Comin' Back/Your Own Kind of Music" (1985), and "Cruel Emotion" (1986). In 1994, Dodson released his solo songs on an album called Secret Hits on Aquarius Records.

In 1992, Dodson re-united with his Stampeders bandmates. The band continue to tour Canada doing fairs, festivals, casinos and theatres.

In 1994, Dodson was inducted into the SOCAN Hall of Fame for composing "Sweet City Woman" and "Carry Me".

In February 2006, Dodson was inducted into the Canadian Songwriters Hall of Fame with "Sweet City Woman". His daughter, Holly Dodson, is a singer-songwriter, vocalist, and key member in Canadian synth-pop trio Parallels.

Discography

Singles

Stampeders songs written by Dodson 
"Morning Magic" (1967)
"Be a Woman" (1968)
"Crosswalk" (1969)
"Carry Me" (1971)
"Sweet City Woman" (1971)
"Devil You" (1971)
"Monday Morning Choo Choo" (1972)
"Wild Eyes" (1972)
"Johnny Lightning" (1973)
"Running Wild" (1974)
"Ramona" (1974)
"San Diego" (1976)
"Baby with You" (1984)
"Oh Belinda" (1996)
"Hometown Boy" (1997)

References

External links 
The Stampeders
Interview with Rich Dodson

1947 births
Living people
Canadian male singers
Canadian rock guitarists
Canadian male guitarists
Canadian songwriters
Musicians from Calgary
Musicians from Greater Sudbury
Writers from Calgary
Writers from Greater Sudbury
Juno Award for Songwriter of the Year winners